Wayne Dennis Smith (January 24, 1950 – November 27, 2016) was a Canadian Football League defensive end who played twelve seasons for five different teams. He was a CFL All-Star two times and was on the Grey Cup winning team in 1969 and 1973. He died in his sleep at his home in Halifax on November 27, 2016. He was 66.

References

External links

1950 births
2016 deaths
BC Lions players
Canadian football defensive linemen
Hamilton Tiger-Cats players
Ottawa Rough Riders players
Players of Canadian football from Nova Scotia
Saskatchewan Roughriders players
Sportspeople from Halifax, Nova Scotia
Toronto Argonauts players